Atlantika is a Philippine television drama fantasy series broadcast by GMA Network. Directed by Zoren Legaspi, it stars Dingdong Dantes. It premiered on October 2, 2006 on the network's Telebabad line up replacing Majika. The series concluded on February 9, 2007 with a total of 95 episodes. It was replaced by Super Twins in its timeslot.

A special, Atlantika: Ang Lihim ng Karagatan was aired on October 1, 2006. The series is streaming online on YouTube.

Cast and characters

Lead cast
 Dingdong Dantes as Aquano

Supporting cast
 Rudy Fernandez as Camaro
 Jean Garcia as Celebes / Celeste
 Ariel Rivera as Baraccud
 Gardo Versoza as Agat
 Cherry Pie Picache as Remedios
 Iza Calzado as Amaya / Cielo
 Paolo Contis as Piranus
 Katrina Halili as Ruana / Helena
 Chynna Ortaleza as Vera
 Isabel Oli as Alona
 Tin Arnaldo
 Valerie Concepcion as Elisa
 Bianca King as Xera
 Elvis Gutierrez as Andromedo
 Mark Gil as Felipe
 Pen Medina as Naval / Balawis
 Ronnie Lazaro as Roman
 Janice Jurado as Amaya's adoptive mom
 Jackie Castillejo as Remedios' sister
 Jojo Alejar
 Gene Padilla as Talakitok
 Arthur Solinap as Eno

Guest cast
 Celia Rodriguez as Segunda
 Emilio Garcia as Ereus
 Edwin Reyes as Tiktakulo
 Noel Urbano as Elahe
 Renz Valerio as young Aquano
 Biboy Ramirez as Daniel
 Bianca Pulmano as young Amaya 
 Ella Cruz as young Elisa 
 Desiree del Valle as Azita  
 Jana Victoria
 Rugene Ramos as Kiko
 Red Bustamante as Nacyfe

References

External links
 
 

2006 Philippine television series debuts
2007 Philippine television series endings
Fantaserye and telefantasya
Filipino-language television shows
GMA Network drama series
Television shows set in the Philippines